The 2012–13 UTSA Roadrunners men's basketball team represented the University of Texas at San Antonio during the 2012–13 NCAA Division I men's basketball season. The Roadrunners, led by seventh year head coach Brooks Thompson, played their home games at the Convocation Center and were first year members of the Western Athletic Conference. They finished the season 10–22, 3–14 in WAC play to finish in a tie for eighth place. They advanced to the semifinals of the WAC tournament to Texas–Arlington.

This was their only season as a member of the WAC as they joined Conference USA in July 2013

Roster

Schedule

|-
!colspan=9| Exhibition
 
|-
!colspan=9| Regular season

|-
!colspan=9| WAC tournament

March 7's game vs San Jose State was canceled due to a leak in the roof at The Events Center Arena in San Jose. The game was not made up.

References

UTSA Roadrunners men's basketball seasons
UTSA
UTSA Roadrunners
UTSA Roadrunners